DOB or Dob often refers to date of birth.

DOB or Dob may also refer to:

Biochemistry
 2,5-dimethoxy-4-bromoamphetamine, Bromo-DMA, a psychedelic drug
 Meta-DOB, related substance
 Methyl-DOB, related substance
 HLA-DOB, human gene

Organizations
 Daughters of Bilitis, an international lesbian and feminist organization
 Dykes on Bikes, international network of lesbian motorcycle clubs

People
 Mounir Dob (born 1974), Algerian football referee
 Daniel O'Brien (comedian), writer for Cracked.com

Places
 Dob (toponym), a Slovene toponym, also found in Austria and Italy
 Dob, Domžale, Upper Carniola, Slovenia, a village
 Dob, a hamlet of Slovenska Vas, Šentrupert, Slovenia, with a pear tree avenue and a prison
 Dob, Bhopal, a village in India

Other
 Division of Banks, an Australian Electoral Division in New South Wales
 Dust of Basement, an electronic music band originally from Berlin
 Deutsche Oper Berlin, opera company in the Charlottenburg district of Berlin
 NATO Dispersed Operating Bases (DOBs)
 Dobo Airport, Indonesia (IATA code DOB)
 , a cultivar of Karuka
 Dobsonian telescope, often referred to as a "Dob"

See also

 Dob-dob, Tibetan monk
 Dob's Linn, geologically significant location in Scotland
 
 Dobber (disambiguation)
 Dobb (disambiguation)
 Dobbs (disambiguation)
 Dobby (disambiguation)
 Daub